Ben Grossmann (born c. 1977) is a visual effects supervisor in Los Angeles, California. He won an Oscar award for Hugo in 2012.

Career
In 2014, with partners Alex Henning, and Rodrigo Teixeira, he formed MAGNOPUS, a visual development company with offices in downtown Los Angeles.

Awards
In 2013, he was nominated for an Academy Award for the film Star Trek Into Darkness.
In 2012, he won an Academy Award for the film Hugo.
In 2006, he won an Emmy for Outstanding Special Visual Effects for the Scifi Miniseries The Triangle.

References

External links

1970s births
Best Visual Effects Academy Award winners
Emmy Award winners
Living people
People from Fairbanks, Alaska
People from Washington, D.C.
Special effects coordinators
University of Alaska Fairbanks alumni
Year of birth missing (living people)